Mount Mary's Higher Secondary School is a private aided co-educational higher secondary school located within Chinchinim in the Indian  coastal state of Goa. It was established in 1996 and is affiliated to Department of Education, Goa and Goa Board of Secondary & Higher Secondary Education, Porvorim. The school also serves as a sub-centre of the Navelim main centre in the HSSC exams.

Managers

Principals

Infrastructure

Sports
The school competes at inter-school, taluka and state level football competitions. On 16 August 2013, Mount Mary's Higher Secondary School beat Bethany Convent High School, Sao Jose de Areal by a 4–2 victory via a tie-breaker to qualify in the second round of Salcete Taluka under-17 Subroto Mukherjee inter-school football tournament at Carmel college ground, Nuvem.

On 12 July 2014, Mount Mary's Higher Secondary School defeated St. Xavier's High School by a  3–1 victory via a tie-breaker in the Salcete Taluka under-17 Subroto Mukerjee inter-school football tournament which was organized by Directorate of Sports And Youth Affairs (DYSA) at Mandopa ground, Navelim. The tournament was participated by over 35 schools and higher secondary schools from all over the state.

On 2 October 2014, Mount Mary's Higher Secondary School were among the 8 schools that managed to win two out of their three games in the under-19 all-Goa inter-higher secondary school football league, organized by DSYA in association with Goa Football Association and Goa Football Development Council. They also managed to tie against Gauncar Higher Secondary School, Raia in a goalless match. The tournament ended with Alston Mendes being the highest scorer of the tournament.

On 17 December 2015, Mount Mary's Higher Secondary and High School, Chinchinim organised the match to commemorate and honour St.Joseph Vaz between Rosary High School, Navelim and St.Xaviers High School, Velim where the latter lost by a 2–1 defeat in All Goa Inter-School Under 17 Invitational Football Tournament held at Chinchinim Church ground.

On 19 December 2015, Mount Mary's Higher Secondary and High School, Chinchinim organised the quarter-finals qualifying match between Our Lady of Health High School, Cuncolim and Our Lady of Rosary's High School, Fatorda where the latter lost by a 6–0 defeat in the  St Joseph Vaz Cup 2015-16 held at Chinchinim Church ground.

On 3 May 2017, Mount Mary's Higher Secondary School lost to Rosary Higher Secondary School, Navelim by a 3–2 defeat in the of the OORJA-CAPFs U-19 Football Talent Hunt Tournament in girls’ category.

On 20 July 2017, Mount Mary's Higher Secondary School lost to Our Lady of Succor High School, Nagoa-Verna by a 6–4 defeat via a tie-breaker in the Subroto Mukherjee Cup U-17 football tournament, organised at the Astro turf ground, Fatorda.

On 10 October 2017, Mount Mary's Higher Secondary School lost to Rosary Higher Secondary School, Navelim by a 6–0 defeat in the senior boys league match of the Reliance Foundation Youth Sports football tournament, at the Ambelim football ground.

On 16 August 2019, Mount Mary's Higher Secondary School beat Navy Children Higher Secondary School, Vasco by a 3–0 victory of the U-19 boys zone inter-higher secondary school football tournament, which was organised by DSYA, at Astroturf ground, Fatorda. On 27 August 2019, they lost to Fr Agnel Higher Secondary School, Verna by a 2–0 defeat in the pre-quarter finals match.

Co-curricular activities
On 7 August 2014, the school organised a multilingual singing competition (English, Konkani and Hindi), judged by Agustinho Themudo, Rohan Goes and Ms Wahida.

On 12 August 2017, the school organised a Van Mahotsav programme which was participated by Goa Forward Party leader and then-Goa Legislative Assembly cabinet minister, Vijai Sardesai in the presence of then-parish priest, Fr. Jose Antonio da Costa. Sardesai recommended that an unutilised agriculture farm could be used to promote floriculture.

Alumni achievements
On 16 May 2016, Muhammad Arafat Shaik died from drowning in the river along with councillor of Margao Municipal Council, Ashlesha Naik in the Khandepar river at Vagurbem-Sonarbag. He had stood first in the state by securing 92.6% in the vocational stream (catering and restaurant management course) at the Higher Secondary School Certificate (HSSC) exams. Shaik was the son of Mount Mary's Higher Secondary School faculty member, Sadika M. Ali.

In 2020 HSSC exams, Sarah Liza Fernandes topped in Secretarial Practice in the state by securing 99% marks.

2021 Arson
On 20 February 2021, the then-principal of the school, Trevor Vaz Barretto's car was set on fire at around 2:50 am, he alleged that four miscreants came on two motorcycles and set the fire with an explosive substance.

On 24 February 2021, Fatorda police arrested a Multi Tasking Staff (MTS) member of the same school as a suspect in the case of setting fire to the vehicle. The police inspector incharge, Kapil Nayak later confirmed that there was no explosive substance used in this case, on the basis of a CCTV footage. Nayak further stated that there was no lead about the other individuals involved since the suspect didn't buldge any details. The Fire Department later concluded the investigation stating that it was a short circuit and not an attempt.

On 3 May 2021, the Higher Secondary Principals' Forum (HSPF) wrote a letter to the Superintendent of Police, South Goa (SP) pleading to take strict action against the culprits for setting on fire of Barretto's car. The forum president, Damodar Panchwadkar and executive members, Walter Cabral and Bruno Carvalho met the SP to discuss about the case. They also alleged that the police force had taken the issue for "granted" and to date no strict action has been taken against the culprits involved in the act.

SP Pankaj Kumar Gupta, IPS, assured the principals that the individuals responsible for the crime are brought to light.

See also

 List of schools in Goa
 Education in Goa

Notes

References

External links
 Mount Mary's Higher Secondary School on YouTube
 

1996 establishments in Goa
Schools in Goa
Schools in India
Private schools in Goa
Education in South Goa district
High schools and secondary schools in Goa
Buildings and structures in Goa
Catholic schools in India